Aleksandar Kalanj (born May 30, 1986) is a Serbian professional basketball player who last played for Železničar Inđija

External links
 Aleksandar Kalanj at eurobasket.com
 Aleksandar Kalanj at realgm.com

1986 births
Living people
Basketball players from Belgrade
CSU Pitești players
KK Napredak Kruševac players
KK Zemun players
KK Železničar Inđija players
Serbian expatriate basketball people in Bulgaria
Serbian expatriate basketball people in Bosnia and Herzegovina
Serbian expatriate basketball people in Italy
Serbian expatriate basketball people in Romania
Serbian expatriate basketball people in North Macedonia
Serbian expatriate basketball people in Spain
Serbian men's basketball players
Power forwards (basketball)